L. L. Zamenhof (15 December 185914 April 1917) was an ophthalmologist who lived for most of his life in Warsaw. He is best known as the creator of Esperanto, the most widely used constructed international auxiliary language.

Zamenhof first developed the Esperanto language in 1873 while still in school. He grew up fascinated by the idea of a world without war and believed that this could happen with the help of a new international auxiliary language. The language would be a tool to gather people together through neutral, fair, equitable communication. He successfully formed a community that continues today despite the World Wars of the 20th century, attempts to reform the language, and more modern IALs (the only other language like it at the time was Volapük). Additionally, Esperanto has developed like other languages: through the interaction and creativity of its users.

In light of his achievements, and his support of intercultural dialogue, UNESCO selected Zamenhof as one of its eminent personalities of 2017, on the 100th anniversary of his death. As of 2019, there are a minimum of 2 million people speaking Esperanto, including an estimated 1,000 native speakers.

Name

Zamenhof came from a multilingual area. His name is transliterated as follows:
 English:  – English pronunciation: 
 Esperanto:  – 
 French:  – 
 German:  – 
  – 
 Lithuanian: 
 Polish:  – 
 
 
 

Born into an Ashkenazi family, at his birth Zamenhof was given the common Hebrew name Eliezer by his parents, the equivalent of the English Lazarus. The change of the initial letter from « S » to « Z » is not unusual, as in German an initial « s » is pronounced .

In his adolescence he used both the Yiddish Leyzer and the Russian Lazar when writing his first name. While at university, Zamenhof began using the Russian name Lyudovik (also transcribed Ludovic or translated as Ludwig) in place of Lazar, possibly in honor of Francis Lodwick, who in 1652 had published an early conlang proposal. When his brother Leon became a doctor and started signing his name "Dr L. Zamenhof", Zamenhof reclaimed his birth name Lazar and from 1901 signed his name "Dr L. L. Zamenhof" to avoid confusion with his brother. The two L's do not seem to have specifically represented either name, and the order Ludwik Lejzer is a modern convention.

Biography

Early years

Zamenhof was born on 15 December 1859, the son of Mark and Rozalia Zamenhof, in the multi-ethnic city of Belostok (now Białystok in Poland). At that time, the city was in the Grodno Governorate of the Russian Empire. His parents were of Litvak Jewish descent. He appears to have been natively bilingual in Yiddish and Russian. His father was a teacher of German and French. From him, Zamenhof learned both languages, as well as Hebrew. He also spoke some major languages of Białystok, such as Polish and Belarusian. Polish became the native language of his children in Warsaw. In school, he studied the classical languages Latin, Greek, and Aramaic. He later learned some English, though in his own words not very well. He had an interest in Lithuanian and Italian and learned Volapük when it came out in 1880. By that time, his international language project was already well developed.

In addition to the Jewish Yiddish-speaking minority, the population of Białystok included Roman Catholic Poles and Eastern Orthodox Russians (mainly government officials), with smaller groups of Belarusians, Germans and other ethnic groups. Zamenhof was saddened and frustrated by the many quarrels among these groups. He supposed that the main reason for the hate and prejudice lay in the mutual misunderstanding caused by the lack of a common language. If such a language existed, Zamenhof postulated, it could play the role of a neutral communication tool between people of different ethnic and linguistic backgrounds.

As a student at secondary school in Warsaw, Zamenhof attempted to create an international language with a grammar that was rich, but complex. When he later studied English, he decided that the international language must have a simpler grammar. Apart from his parents' native languages Russian and Yiddish and his adopted language Polish, his projects were also aided by his mastery of German, a good passive understanding of Latin, Hebrew and French, and a basic knowledge of Greek, English and Italian.

By 1878, his project Lingwe uniwersala was finished. However, Zamenhof was too young then to publish his work. Soon after graduation he began to study medicine, first in Moscow, and later in Warsaw. In 1885, Zamenhof graduated from university and began his practice as a doctor in Veisiejai. After 1886, he worked as an ophthalmologist in Płock and Vienna. While healing people there, he continued to work on his project of an international language.

For two years, he tried to raise funds to publish a booklet describing the language, until he received the financial help from his future wife's father. In 1887, the book titled Международный язык. Предисловие и полный учебникъ (International language: Introduction and complete textbook) was published in Russian under the pseudonym "Doktoro Esperanto" (Doctor Hoper, or literally "Doctor One Who Hopes"). Zamenhof initially called his language "Lingvo internacia" (international language), but those who learned it began to call it Esperanto after his pseudonym, and this soon became the official name for the language. For Zamenhof, this language, far from being merely a communication tool, was a way to promote peaceful coexistence between people of different cultures.

Work on Yiddish language and Jewish issues

In 1879, Zamenhof wrote the first grammar of Yiddish. It was partly published years later in the Yiddish magazine . In this work, not only does he provide a review of Yiddish grammar, but also proposes its transition to the Latin script and other orthographic innovations. In the same period Zamenhof wrote some other works in Yiddish, including perhaps the first survey of Yiddish poetics (see p. 50 in the above-cited book).

In 1882 a wave of pogroms within the Russian Empire, including Congress Poland, motivated Zamenhof to take part in the early Zionist movement, the Hibbat Zion. He left the movement in 1887, and in 1901 published a statement in Russian with the title Hillelism, in which he argued that the Zionist project could not solve the problems of the Jewish people.

In 1914, he declined an invitation to join a new organization of Jewish Esperantists, the TEHA. In his letter to the organizers, he said, "I am profoundly convinced that every nationalism offers humanity only the greatest unhappiness ... It is true that the nationalism of oppressed peoples – as a natural self-defensive reaction – is much more excusable than the nationalism of peoples who oppress; but, if the nationalism of the strong is ignoble, the nationalism of the weak is imprudent; both give birth to and support each other". The Hebrew Bible is among the many works that Zamenhof translated into Esperanto.

Zamenhof died in Warsaw on 14 April 1917, possibly of a heart attack, and was buried at the Okopowa Street Jewish Cemetery. The farewell speech was delivered by the chief rabbi and preacher of the Great Synagogue in Warsaw, Samuel Abraham Poznański, who said: "There will be a time where the Polish soil and nation will understand what fame gave this great son of God to his homeland."

Family
Zamenhof and his wife Klara Silbernik raised three children, a son, Adam, and two daughters, Zofia and Lidia. All three were murdered in the Holocaust.

Lidia Zamenhof in particular took a keen interest in Esperanto, and as an adult became a teacher of the language, traveling through Europe and to America to teach classes in it. Through her friendship with Martha Root, Lidia accepted Bahá'u'lláh and became a member of the Baháʼí Faith. As one of its social principles, the Baháʼí Faith teaches that an auxiliary world language should be selected by the representatives of all the world's nations.

Zamenhof's grandson, Louis-Christophe Zaleski-Zamenhof (Adam's son), lived in France from the 1960s until his death in 2019. As of 2020, Louis-Christophe's daughter, Margaret Zaleski-Zamenhof, is active in the Esperanto movement.

Religious philosophy

Besides his linguistic work, Zamenhof published a religious philosophy he called Homaranismo (the term in Esperanto, usually rendered as "humanitism" in English, sometimes rendered loosely as humanitarianism or humanism), based on the principles and teachings of Hillel the Elder. He said of Homaranismo: "It is indeed the object of my whole life. I would give up everything for it."

Honours and namesakes
In 1905, Zamenhof received the Légion d'honneur for creating Esperanto. In 1910, Zamenhof was first nominated for the Nobel Peace Prize, by four British Members of Parliament (including James O'Grady and Philip Snowden) and Professor Stanley Lane Poole. (The Prize was instead awarded to the International Peace Bureau.) Ultimately Zamenhof was nominated 12 times for the Nobel Peace Prize. On the occasion of the fifth Universala Kongreso de Esperanto in Barcelona, Zamenhof was made a Commander of the Order of Isabella the Catholic by King Alfonso XIII of Spain.

A monument or place linked to Zamenhof or Esperanto is known as a Zamenhof-Esperanto object (or ZEO).

The minor planet 1462 Zamenhof is named in his honour. It was discovered on 6 February 1938 by Yrjö Väisälä. There is also a minor planet named in honour of Esperanto (1421 Esperanto).

Hundreds of city streets, parks, and bridges worldwide have also been named after Zamenhof. In Lithuania, the best-known Zamenhof Street is in Kaunas, where he lived and owned a house for some time. There are others in Poland, the United Kingdom, France, Hungary, Croatia, the Czech Republic, Spain (mostly in Catalonia), Italy, Israel, Belgium and Brazil. There are Zamenhof Hills in Hungary and Brazil, and a Zamenhof Island in the Danube.

In some Israeli cities, street signs identify Esperanto's creator and give his birth and death dates, but refer to him solely by his Jewish name Eliezer (a variant of which, El'azar, is the origin of Lazarus). Zamenhof is honoured as a deity by the Japanese religion Oomoto, which encourages the use of Esperanto among its followers. A genus of lichen has been named Zamenhofia in his honour, as well as the species Heteroplacidium zamenhofianum.

In the years 1896–97 N. A. Borovko became its chairman. A monument to L. Zamenhof was installed in Odessa in an ordinary residential courtyard. Esperantist sculptor Nikolai Vasilyevich Blazhkov lived in this house, who in the early 1960s brought a sculptural portrait into the courtyard, because the customs authorities did not allow the sculpture to be sent to the Esperanto Congress in Vienna.

In Gothenburg, Sweden a public square is named Esperantoplatsen.

In Italy, a few streets are named after Esperanto, including Largo Esperanto in Pisa.

In 1959, UNESCO honoured Zamenhof in the occasion of his centenary. In 2015, it decided to support the celebration of the 100th anniversary of his death.

His birthday, 15 December, is celebrated annually as Zamenhof Day by users of Esperanto. On 15 December 2009, Esperanto's green-starred flag flew on the Google homepage to commemorate Zamenhof's 150th birthday.

The house of the Zamenhof family and a monument to Zamenhof are sites on the Jewish Heritage Trail in Białystok, which was opened in June 2008 by volunteers at The University of Białystok Foundation. Białystok is also home to the Ludwik Zamenhof Centre.

In 1960, Esperanto summer schools were established in Stoke-on-Trent in the United Kingdom by the Esperanto Association of Britain (EAB), which began to provide lessons and promote the language locally. There is a road named after Zamenhof in the city: Zamenhof Grove.

As Dr. Zamenhof was born on 15 December 1859, the Esperanto Society of New York gathers every December to celebrate Zamenhofa Tago (Zamenhof Day in Esperanto).

Partial bibliography

Original works
 Unua Libro, 1887 (First Book)
 Dua Libro, 1888 (Second Book)
 Hilelismo – propono pri solvo de la hebrea demando, 1901 (Hillelism: A Project in Response to the Jewish Question)
 Esenco kaj estonteco de la ideo de lingvo internacia, 1903 (Essence and Future of the Idea of an International Language)
 Fundamenta Krestomatio de la Lingvo Esperanto, 1903 (Basic Anthology of the Esperanto Language)
 Fundamento de Esperanto, 1905 (Foundation of Esperanto)
 Declaration of Boulogne, 1905
 Homaranismo, 1913 (Humanitism)

Periodicals
 La Esperantisto, 1889–1895 (The Esperantist)
 Lingvo Internacia, 1895–1914 (International Language)
 La Revuo, 1906–1914 (The Review)

Poems
 "Al la fratoj" ("To the Brothers")
 "Ho, mia kor'" ("Oh, My Heart")
 "La Espero" ("The Hope")
 "La vojo" ("The Way")
 "Mia penso" ("My Thought")

Translations
 Hamleto, Reĝido de Danujo, 1894 (Hamlet, Prince of Denmark, by William Shakespeare)
 La batalo de l' vivo (The Battle of Life, by Charles Dickens)
 La revizoro, 1907 (The Government Inspector, by Nikolai Gogol)
 La Predikanto, 1907 (translation of Ecclesiastes)
 La Psalmaro, 1908 (translation of the book of Psalms)
 La rabistoj, 1908 (The Robbers, by Friedrich Schiller)
 Ifigenio en Taŭrido, 1908 (Iphigenia in Tauris, by Johann Wolfgang von Goethe)
 La Rabeno de Baĥaraĥ, 1909 ("The Rabbi of Bacharach", by Heinrich Heine)
 La Gimnazio, 1909 ("The High School", by Scholem Aleichem)
 Marta, 1910 (Marta, by Eliza Orzeszkowa)
 Genezo, 1911 (translation of the Book of Genesis)
 Eliro, 1912 (translation of the Book of Exodus)
 Levidoj, 1912 (translation of the Book of Leviticus)
 Nombroj, 1914 (translation of the Book of Numbers)
 Readmono, 1914 (translation of the Book of Deuteronomy)
 Malnova Testamento (parts of the Old Testament)

Gallery

See also
 Adam Zamenhof
 Zamenhof Day

Notes

References

External links
 
 
 

1859 births
1917 deaths
19th-century translators
Articles containing video clips
Commanders of the Order of Isabella the Catholic
Commandeurs of the Légion d'honneur
Constructed language creators
Esperanto history
Esperanto literature
Esperanto speaking Jews
Linguists of Yiddish
Inventors from the Russian Empire
Jews from the Russian Empire
Linguists from Poland
People from Belostoksky Uyezd
People from Białystok
Polish Esperantists
Polish inventors
Polish Ashkenazi Jews
Polish ophthalmologists
Translators of Johann Wolfgang von Goethe
Translators of the Bible into Esperanto
Translators of William Shakespeare